John C. Oxley, a.k.a. "Jack", (born 1937) is an American oilman, horse breeder and polo player.

Biography

Early life
John C. Oxley was born on January 24, 1937, in Tulsa, Oklahoma. His father was John T. Oxley, a polo player.

Polo
A five-goal player, he won U.S. Open Polo Championship in 1983, the Cowdray Park Gold Cup with the Boca Raton team in 1970, the C.V. Whitney Cup, the Rolex Gold Cup, the America Cup, the Monty Waterbury Cup, the Pacific Coast Open, the 12 and 16 Goal Championships, three Chairman's Cups, the Butler Handicap, the North American Cup and numerous Sunshine League titles.

In 1985, he received the Hugo Dalmar Award. He served as president of the United States Polo Association, and as its Chairman from 1988 to 1991. He was inducted into the Museum of Polo and Hall of Fame on February 18, 2005.

Together with his brother Thomas, he co-owns the Royal Palm Polo Sports Club in Boca Raton, Florida founded by his late father.

Thoroughbred breeding
As a Thoroughbred racehorse owner and breeder, he won the 2001 Kentucky Derby with Monarchos and owned Beautiful Pleasure, the 1999 American Champion Older Female Horse and winner of the Breeders' Cup Distaff.

Philanthropy
He is a trustee of the Oxley Foundation, which donates to polo players and schools. It has also donated US$1 million to the Grayson-Jockey Club Research Foundation, where John Oxley is a board member.

References

1937 births
American businesspeople in the oil industry
American polo players
American racehorse owners and breeders
Owners of Kentucky Derby winners
Sportspeople from Tulsa, Oklahoma
Living people